Pacific Ocean Fire were a folk rock group from Leicester, England, who released five albums. Their music was generally considered alternative or Americana.

History
The band formed in 2001 and comprised Jon Bennett (vocals, guitar), his brother Andy Bennett (drums), Ross Voce (guitar), and David Fellows (bass, trumpet). They cited among their influences Sebadoh, Dennis Wilson, Plush, Tindersticks, and Silver Jews. The band recorded two EP's which they gave away at concerts, leading to American label Smokeylung picking them up and releasing their self-titled second album in 2005, a North American tour following.

Their third album, From the Station to the Church We are Under the Same Stars, was released on Sorted Records, the title referring to the way it was recorded:
"We recorded half of the album in a room above Leicester train station. The other half was recorded and mixed at Dave’s home, he lived on a road with “church” in the street name . We spent so much time between those places late at night that became it".

After previously playing the Musician Stage of the Summer Sundae festival, they performed on the main stage in 2007, also performing regularly at Truck Festival and the dumduckerdum Music Festival, then going on to tour the UK with Josh T Pearson. The band's fourth album, Strangers and Deranged Patients was released in November 2007 on the American Azra label. It was followed by a US tour in 2008.

The band split in September 2009 after performing their farewell gig at Camden Dingwalls supporting Drugstore, following an invitation to play from Isabel Monteiro. Their final album, Hibernation songs, written amidst and largely about very personal tragedies for songwriter Jon Bennett, namely the dissolution of his marriage and the death of his father was released on Azra Records in July 2010.

Discography

Singles
Roadsigns EP (2003)
Whiskey Fiction EP (2005)
"Split EP" 10" EP (2005) Sorted (split with Don's Mobile Barbers)

Albums
Tales of Love and Loss and Living (2003) Self released
Pacific Ocean Fire (2005) Smokeylung records
From The Station to the Church We Are Under The Same Stars (2006) Sorted records
Strangers and Deranged Patients (2007) Azra records
Hibernation songs (2010) Azra records

Compilation appearances
Comes with a Smile Vol. 15 – Gloved Hands in a Squeeze (2005) Comes With a Smile, includes "My Drinking Days are Done"
50minutes (2006) Exercise 1, includes "Death on Yr Birthday"

References

External links
Official website

Reviews

"Pacific Ocean Fire are our unexpected treat sounding a bit like an English Bright Eyes circa Lifted " – Drowned in Sound

“ These eleven songs are a beautiful collection of wistful, poetic 2am music, the sort of stuff you probably have to be alone and in a reflective mood to appreciate properly. It's low-key and often lovelorn, and every song on the album stands up in its own right – there simply isn't any filler ” – Twisted Ear 4.5 / 5

“ Like Thin White Rope circa 'The Ruby Sea' transplanted to an obscure UK seaside town, this is one of those rare occasions where a record is so strong you’re pretty much spoiled for choice in terms of trying to single our favourites “ – Whisperin & Hollerin 9 /10

“ If the songs were visual, they’d be a couple waltzing alone under the spattered light of a nicotine-stained mirror ball. They all share a sort of ragged, sentimental glory “ – Americana UK 8/10

"Glorious, luminous, ragged, backporch songs as if they’d been raised under western skies with little more than coyote howls for company “
– The Sun 4.5 / 5

"A beautiful record best kept for moonlit summer drives "
– Maverick 4 / 5
Dowling, Jordan (2007) "Pacific Ocean Fire, Josh T Pearson at Leicester Firebug, Fri 14 Sep" (review), Drowned in Sound
Graham, Steve "Pacific Ocean Fire – From The Station To Church We Are Under The Same Stars" (review), Hybrid Magazine
Pirie, Karen "Sinister and beautiful country noir" (live review), BBC Leicester
Edwards, Phil (2006) "Pacific Ocean Fire & Don's Mobile Barbers "10" Split EP"" (review), Americana UK
Kingsworth, Beck (2006) "Pacific Ocean Fire – From The Station to the Church We Are Under The Same Stars" (review), Twisted Ear
Cracknell, Robin (2006) "Pacific Ocean Fire – From The Station to the Church We Are Under The Same Stars" (review), Americana UK
Peacock, Tim (2006) "Pacific Ocean Fire – From The Station to the Church We Are Under The Same Stars" (review), whisperinandhollerin.com
Searle, Jeremy (2005) "Pacific Ocean Fire – Pacific Ocean Fire" (review), Americana UK
Searle, Jeremy (2005) "Pacific Ocean Fire – Whiskey Fiction" (review), Americana UK
Jarvis, Toby (2004) "Pacific Ocean Fire: Roadsigns" (review), Drowned in Sound

Musical groups established in 2001
English folk musical groups
Americana music groups
Musical groups from Leicester
Americana in the United Kingdom